"Non Sequitur" is the 21st episode of Star Trek: Voyager, the fifth episode in the second season. Harry Kim is enigmatically stranded back on Earth, only to discover the lives of his companions have been radically altered. Much of the episode takes place on Earth in the same era as Voyager, but in alternate timeline caused by an anomaly.

The episode aired on UPN on September 25, 1995.

Plot
Harry Kim is aboard a shuttlecraft as it is shaking violently. As he contacts Voyager, Captain Janeway attempts to beam him out, and he awakens on Earth in San Francisco next to his girlfriend, Libby, whom he had dearly missed. The date is the same as he remembered, but his life is completely different: Harry retains his memories of his time on Voyager, yet there is no evidence he was ever aboard. Kim finds he was denied a posting on Voyager and then took an assignment working at the shuttlecraft development center at Starfleet Headquarters.

After he leaves a briefing with staff admirals because of "sickness", he looks for any explanation for his current situation. Harry uses his knowledge of Voyagers security codes to obtain classified information on his ship. Kim realizes he has somehow swapped places with his friend Daniel Byrd. While skimming through the crew manifest, Kim notices Tom Paris is not listed as part of Voyagers crew either. He learns Paris now lives in Marseilles, France, after his parole, and goes there to try to enlist his help in figuring out what happened. Paris tells Kim that he lost his "advisor's" spot on Voyager after Odo threw him in the brig for getting into a fight with a Ferengi prior to Voyagers departure — a fight Kim prevented in the pilot episode.

Upon his return to San Francisco, Kim is apprehended by security and taken to Starfleet Headquarters for questioning because of his unauthorized access to restricted files and his recent association with Paris. Kim is suspected of being a Maquis spy and is fitted with a security anklet to track his movements. He discovers that a shuttlecraft accident caused him to fall into a time-stream and enter a timeline where he was never a part of Voyagers crew. A time-stream alien tells Kim that if he recreates the conditions of the accident precisely, he might get back to his own reality, but there is considerable risk. Harry tries to tamper with his security anklet, but sets off the tampering alarm, which alerts Starfleet. Paris comes to Kim's aid and rescues him. They steal a runabout and recreate the accident moments before they are destroyed. Immediately Kim is returned to his own reality and is happy to find everything is as he remembers it.

Production
The episode was partly shot on the same set used as New Orleans in Star Trek: Deep Space Nine and reuses old footage from Star Trek IV: The Voyage Home and the Star Trek: The Next Generation episode "Relics".

See also
Timeless (Star Trek: Voyager) (another timeline "branch")
Yesterday's Enterprise (TNG S3E15, another Star Trek episode about time anomalies and their impact)
Non sequitur, for the literary device and invalid argument

References

External links
 

Star Trek: Voyager (season 2) episodes
Star Trek time travel episodes
1995 American television episodes
Alternate history television episodes
Television episodes directed by David Livingston
Television episodes written by Brannon Braga